Tough as Nails is an American reality competition television series that premiered on CBS on July 8, 2020, and is hosted by Phil Keoghan.

On March 9, 2022, the series was renewed for a fifth season.

Series overview

Episodes

Season 1 (2020)

Season 2 (2021)

Season 3 (2021)

Season 4 (2023)

References 

Lists of reality television series episodes
Episodes